Ansculf de Picquigny (c. 1014 – c. 1084) was a French baron who followed William the Conqueror to England.

Biography
Ansculf de Picquigny, born around 1014, was the son of Guermond de Picquigny, Picquigny being a village near Amiens in Picardy. Ansculf must have played a significant role in the invasion as he was awarded some 80 manors spread over 11 counties (Berkshire, Buckinghamshire, Hertfordshire, Middlesex, Northamptonshire, Oxfordshire, Rutland, Staffordshire, Surrey, Warwickshire and Worcestershire) and made sheriff of Surrey and Buckinghamshire (1066 – c. 1084).

After Earl Edwin's abortive revolt in 1070 he was granted some of Edwin's lands in the West Midlands, including Dudley. It was there that he built Dudley Castle, a Norman motte-and-bailey, which formed a part of a defensive chain protecting the Midlands from the Welsh, and the caput of his barony of Dudley.

He died around 1084 and was succeeded by his son William Fitz-Ansculf. The Pinckney family are their present-day descendants.

External links
 Biography

1010s births
1080s deaths
High Sheriffs of Buckinghamshire
High Sheriffs of Surrey
11th-century French people